The 1962 Rutgers Scarlet Knights football team represented Rutgers University in the 1962 NCAA University Division football season. In their third season under head coach John F. Bateman, the Scarlet Knights compiled a 5–5 record, won the Middle Three Conference championship, and were outscored by their opponents 169 to 164. The team's statistical leaders included Bob Yaksick with 502 passing yards, Bill Thompson with 405 rushing yards, and Bill Craft with 426 receiving yards.

Schedule

References

Rutgers
Rutgers Scarlet Knights football seasons
Rutgers Scarlet Knights football